Same-sex marriage has been legal in San Luis Potosí since 21 May 2019. The state Congress approved a bill to legalize same-sex marriage on 16 May 2019. It was signed into law by Governor Juan Manuel Carreras on 17 May and published in the official state journal on 20 May. The law took effect the following day, legalizing same-sex marriage in San Luis Potosí.

Legal history

Background

The Mexican Supreme Court ruled on 12 June 2015 that state bans on same-sex marriage are unconstitutional nationwide. The court's ruling is considered a "jurisprudential thesis" and did not invalidate state laws, meaning that same-sex couples denied the right to marry would still have to seek individual amparos in court. The ruling standardized the procedures for judges and courts throughout Mexico to approve all applications for same-sex marriages and made the approval mandatory. Specifically, the court ruled that same-sex marriage bans violate Articles 1 and 4 of the Constitution of Mexico. Article 1 of the Constitution states that "any form of discrimination, based on ethnic or national origin, gender, age, disabilities, social status, medical conditions, religion, opinions, sexual orientation, marital status, or any other form, which violates the human dignity or seeks to annul or diminish the rights and freedoms of the people, is prohibited.", and Article 4 relates to matrimonial equality, stating that "man and woman are equal under the law. The law shall protect the organization and development of the family."

In July 2013, a male couple applied for a marriage license but were rejected based on the decision that same-sex couples were not allowed to marry under state law. They were granted the right to marry by the First District Court in an amparo on 3 June 2014. On 26 March 2014, couple Jonathan Llanas and Gadiel Martínez applied for a marriage license at the civil registry office in San Luis Potosí City, but were rejected citing the same reasons given to the first couple. They filed an amparo, which was approved on 4 August 2014 by the Sixth District Court. On 7 August 2014, the civil registry filed a counter-injunction to avoid recording the marriage. An appeal was denied by an appellate court in October 2014 and the registry was ordered to conduct the marriage. In early September 2014, a lesbian couple applied for a marriage license in the city of Ciudad Valles.

In November 2014, the State Human Rights Commission announced it was reviewing two complaints from parties who had received amparos to marry but were still being denied marriage licenses by the civil registry. By January 2017, 20 amparos for same-sex marriage rights had been granted to couples in the state. In May 2019, Paul Ibarra Collazo, president of the local LGBT group Red de Diversificadores Sociales, announced that 150 same-sex couples had married in the state by that time. Ibarra Collazo estimated that the amparo remedy took between one to two months to be resolved, and the cost of the process to be between $4,000 to $15,000.

Legislative action
A citizens' initiative to legalize same-sex marriage was proposed in San Luis Potosí in 2014. It was submitted to the state Congress on 28 April 2014. On 8 August 2014, the deputy chairman of the Commission on Human Rights and Gender Equity, Miguel Maza Hernández, said an analysis of the proposal would "begin shortly". On 17 June 2015, Maza Hernández announced the state's commitment to extending marriage to same-sex couples and said that deliberations would occur after the June 2015 Supreme Court ruling is published in the judicial gazette. Maza Hernández added that although no laws prevented same-sex couples from adopting, Congress would prefer to amend the Family Code to codify equal adoption rights along with passing a same-sex marriage law. On 6 June 2016, it was announced that a special committee would study the marriage bill and vote on it within 90 days. In November 2016, the state Congress voted against the bill legalizing same-sex marriage. A deputy from the Party of the Democratic Revolution (PRD), who had mistakenly voted against the bill, announced he would introduce a new same-sex marriage proposal in 2017. 

The new bill was introduced in October 2017. Momentum was gained after the July 2018 elections, in which the PRD, the National Regeneration Movement (MORENA) and the Labor Party (PT), whose party platforms included support for same-sex marriage, won a plurality of legislative seats in Congress. The bill to legalize same-sex marriage was approved in a vote of 14–12 with 1 abstention on 16 May 2019. It was subsequently signed into law by Governor Juan Manuel Carreras on 17 May and published in the official state journal on 20 May. The law took effect the following day. It ensures that married same-sex couples enjoy the same rights, benefits and responsibilities as married opposite-sex couples, including tax benefits, immigration rights, property rights, inheritance, adoption rights, etc.

Article 15 of the Family Code was amended to read:
 in Spanish: 
 (Marriage is the legal union of two people, freely contracted, based on respect, with equal rights, duties and obligations, that establishes a community of life, with the purpose of providing mutual aid and forming a family.)

Marriage statistics
The following table shows the number of same-sex marriages performed in San Luis Potosí since 2020 as reported by the National Institute of Statistics and Geography.

Public opinion
A 2017 opinion poll conducted by Gabinete de Comunicación Estratégica found that 50% of San Luis Potosí residents supported same-sex marriage, while 46% were opposed.

According to a 2018 survey by the National Institute of Statistics and Geography, 39% of the San Luis Potosí public opposed same-sex marriage.

See also

 Same-sex marriage in Mexico
 LGBT rights in Mexico

Notes

References

San Luis Potosí
San Luis Potosí
2019 in LGBT history